Bridgeport Reservoir is a lake at the lower end of Bridgeport Valley in Mono County, California. Its earth-filled dam was constructed in 1923 by the Walker River Irrigation District, along the East Walker River.

The community of Bridgeport, which is the seat of Mono County, and the Bryant Field airstrip, are located along the river and adjacent to the upper end of the lake.

Recreational opportunities include boating and trout fishing, and resorts with boat launch facilities are located along the lake's eastern shore. Access is provided by California State Route 182.

See also
 List of dams and reservoirs in California
 List of lakes in California

References

Reservoirs in Mono County, California
Reservoirs in California
Reservoirs in Northern California